Igreja de São Mamede is a church building in Évora, Portugal. It is classified as a National Monument.

Sao Mamede
National monuments in Évora District